102 Battalion (pronounced as one-o-two Battalion) was a quick-reaction unit of the South West African Territorial Force. The battalion lost 36 men.

History

Origin
This unit was formed in 1976 as the Kaokoland Company  with 4 men. In 1978 limited recruitment of military personnel commenced and low level defensive operations in the form of patrols are undertaken. The first confirmed infiltration of SWAPO happens in 1979 and the need to establish a more offensive force is recognized and in 1980 recruitment intensifies as does training of the recruits.

Renaming
The South West Africa Territory Force SWATF  renumbered battalion numbers according to their geographical positioning on the border. The prefix 10 pertained to battalions operation to the west of the Kavango River, 20 to the Kavango or central region and 70 to the eastern region. Under this system in 1981 the unit's name is changed from Kaokoland Company 37BATTALION to 102 Battalion (January 1981) and it is placed under the command of Sector 10, Oshakati.

Structure
By 1985, it had 900 plus men in 3 rifle companies based at Opuwo, Okongwati, Ondorrorundu and Sodoliet.

External Operations
 Operation Protea, 1981, one company
 Operation Operation Askari, 1983 
 Operation Excite
 Operation Merlyn, 1989

See also
 Namibian War of Independence
 South African Border War

References

Further reading
Modern African Wars (3): South-West Africa (Osprey Men at Arms #242) by Helmoed-Romer Heitman 
http://groep7-selfpublish-books.co.za/product/war-in-the-mountains-ovita-mozondundu-deon-van-loggerenberg/ by Deon Van Loggerenberg]

Military history of Namibia
Military units and formations of the Cold War
Military units and formations of South Africa
Military units and formations of South Africa in the Border War
Military units and formations established in 1978